This is a list of women artists who were born in Austria or whose artworks are closely associated with that country.

A
Erika Abels d'Albert (1896–1975), painter and graphic designer
Soshana Afroyim (1927–2015), painter
Maria Anwander (born 1980), conceptual artist
Marie von Augustin (1810–1886), painter

B
Maria Bach (1896–1978), painter
Maria Baumgartner (born 1952), ceramist and academic
Luise Begas-Parmentier (1843–1920), Austrian-German painter and salonière
Tina Blau (1845–1916), painter
Emma Bormann (1887–1974), art teacher and printmaker
Eugenie Breithut-Munk (1867–1915), painter
Norbertine Bresslern-Roth (1891–1978), painter, print maker

C
Eva Maria Düringer Cavalli (fl 1977), fashion designer
Katharina Cibulka (born 1975), installation artist
Isabel Czerwenka-Wenkstetten (born 1969), visual artist

D
Gabriele Maria Deininger-Arnhard (1855–1945), German-Austrian painter
Gerti Deutsch (1908–1979), photographer
Friedl Dicker-Brandeis (1898–1944), painter
Irma von Duczynska (1869–1932), painter and sculptor

E
Marie Egner (1850–1940), painter
Bettina Ehrlich, (1903–1985), painter and illustrator
Marie Egner (1850–1940), painting
Ursula Endlicher, multi-media
Marianne von Eschenburg (1856–1937), painter
Valie Export (born 1940), video and performance artist

F
Marina Faust (born 1950), photographer
Emilie Louise Flöge (1874–1952), fashion designer
Mathilde Flögl (1893–1958), artist and graphic designer 
Louise Fraenkel-Hahn (1878–1939), painter
Gustl French (1909–2004), Austrian-American painter, printmaker and photographer
Camilla Friedländer (1856–1928), painter
Hedwig Friedländer(1863–1916), painter
Hortensia Fussy (born 1954), sculptor

G
Olga Granner (1874–1967), portrait painter who married the Swedish sculptor Carl Milles
Hilda Goldwag (1912–2008), painter
Herta Groves (1920–2016), Austrian-British milliner
Eva Grubinger (born 1970), installation artist
Nilbar Gures (born 1977), multi-media

H
Renate Habinger (born 1957), illustrator, graphic artist
Jasmin Hagendorfer, installation art, sculptor, performance artist
Alice Berger Hammerschlag (1917–1969), abstract painter
Margarete Hamerschlag (1902–1958), painter, illustrator
Karin Hannak (born 1940), multi-media
Fanny Harlfinger-Zakucka (1873–1954), painter and graphic artist
Hermine Heller-Ostersetzer (1874–1909), painter and graphic artist
Mercedes Helnwein (born 1979), creator of large-scale drawings
Gertrud Höchsmann (1902–1990), fashion designer
Nina Hollein (born 1971), fashion designer
Stephanie Hollenstein (1886–1944), Expressionist painter

J
Karin Jarl-Sakellarios (1885–1948), sculptor
Hildegard Joos (1909–2005), painter
Birgit Jürgenssen (1949–2003), photographer, painter, graphic artist and teacher

K
Dora Kallmus (1881–1963), photographer
Johanna Kampmann-Freund (1888–1940), painter
Ernestine von Kirchsberg (1857–1924), painter
Kiki Kogelnik (1935–1997), painter, sculptor and printmaker
Sacha Kolin (1911–1981), painter
Broncia Koller-Pinell (1863–1934), painter
Irma Komlosy (1850–1919), painter
Michaela Konrad (born 1972), contemporary artist
Frida Konstantin (1884–1918), painter
Brigitte Kowanz (born 1957), contemporary artist
Barbara Krafft (1764–1825), painter
Grete Wolf Krakauer (1890–1970), painter
Edith Kramer (1916–2014), painter and art therapist
Ilona Kronstein (1897–1948), Budapest-born painter
Elke Krystufek (born 1970), conceptual artist
Felicitas Kuhn (1926–2022), illustrator

L
Maria Lassnig (1919–2014), painter
Gisela Falke von Lilienstein (1871–?), ceramicist, designer
Lia (fl. 1990–), software artist
Roberta Lima (born 1974), video and performance artist
Lea von Littrow (1860–1914), painter
Ulli Lust (born 1967), cartoonist
Mariette Lydis (1887–1970), Austrian-Argentine painter

M
Marianne Maderna (born 1944), sculptor and illustrator
Anna Mahler (1904–1988), sculptor 
Nadja Maleh (born 1972), actress, singer, cabaret artist and director
Margarete Markl (1902–1981), sculptor
Paula Maly (1891–1974), painter
Gerda Matejka-Felden (1901–1984), painter
Ursula Mayer (born 1970), multimedia artist
Rosa Mayreder (1858–1938), painter
Emilie Mediz-Pelikan (1861–1908), painter
Moje Menhardt (born 1934), painter
Olga Milles (1874–1967), portrait painter
Elizabeth Burger Monath (1907–1986), illustrator
Inge Morath (1923–2002), photographer
Marie-Louise von Motesiczky (1906–1996), painter
Bertha Müller (1848–1925), painter
Birgit C. Muller (fl 2000s), fashion designer
Marie Müller (1847–1935), painter
Ulrike Müller (born 1971), mixed-media artist
Agnes Muthspiel (1914–1966), painter

N
Juliana Neuhuber (born 1979), artist and filmmaker
Gertrud Natzler (1908–1971), Austrian-American ceramist

O
Vevean Oviette (1902–1986), painter, print maker

P
Maria Petschnig (born 1977), video artist
Margot Pilz (born 1936), visual artist
Martina Pippal (born 1957), painter, sculptor and art historian
Lisa von Pott (born 1888), sculptor
Adrienne von Pötting (1856–1909), painter
Teresa Präauer (born 1979), writer and visual artist

R
Caroline Ramersdorfer (born 1960), sculptor
Elise Ransonnet-Villez (1843–1899), painter
Barbara Rapp (born 1972), mixed-media artist
Lily Renée (born 1921), illustrator and writer
Lili Réthi (1894–1969), artist and illustrator
Lucie Rie (1902–1995), potter
Elli Riehl (1902–1977), painter
Teresa Feoderovna Ries (1874–1956), sculptor

S
Frieda Salvendy (1887–1968), painter
Karin Schäfer (born 1963), performance artist
Therese Schachner (1869–1950), painter
Martina Schettina (born 1961), mixed media artist
Emma Schlangenhausen (1882–1947), graphic artist
Lene Schneider-Kainer (1885–1971), painter
Gaby Schreiber (1904–1976), industrial and interior designer 
Barbara Schurz (born 1973), performance artist and writer
Rosa Schweninger (1849–1918), painter
Deborah Sengl (born 1974), painter and sculptor
Jutta Sika (1877–1964), graphic designer, ceramist, painter, fashion designer
Susi Singer (1891–1955), Austrian-American ceramist
Tamuna Sirbiladze (1971–2016), Georgian-Austrian painter 
Anna Stainer-Knittel (1841–1915), painter
Edith Stauber (born 1968), film director and illustrator
Martina Steckholzer (born 1974), artist
Lilly Steiner (1884–1961), painter 
Evelin Stermitz (born 1972), video and performance artist
Marguerite Stix (1904–1975), sculptor, jeweller and ceramist
Ceija Stojka (1933–2013), painter, writer and musician
Marianne Stokes (1855–1927), painter
Josefine Swoboda (1861–1924), painter

T
Ernestine Tahedl (born 1940), Austrian-Canadian painter
Bertha von Tarnóczy (1846–1936), art teacher and painter
Helene von Taussig (1879–1942), painter
Ottilie Tolansky (1912–1977), painter
Hede von Trapp (1877–1947), painter, illustrator and poet
Edith Tudor Hart (1908–1973), photographer and spy
Esin Turan (born 1970), sculptor and painter
Ilse Twardowski-Conrat (1880–1942), sculptor

U
Carola Unterberger-Probst (born 1978), new media artist and philosopher

V
Helena Kottler Vurnik (1882–1962), Austrian-Slovenian illustrator and painter

W
Rosina Wachtmeister (born 1939), sculptor, painter
Trude Waehner(1900–1979), painter
Pepi Weixlgärtner-Neutra (1886–1981), Austrian-Swedish graphic designer, painter, sculptor
Susanne Wenger (1915–2009), painter and sculptor
Vally Wieselthier (1895–1945), Austrian-American ceramist
Elisabeth Wild (1922–2020), collage artist
Grete Wilhelm (1887–1942), painter
Olga Wisinger-Florian (1844–1926), painter
Grete Wolf Krakauer (1890–1970), painter
Marie Elisabeth Wrede (1898–1981), portrait painter

Z
Franziska Zach (1900–1930), painter
Lisbeth Zwerger (born 1954), illustrator

See also
List of Austrian women photographers

-
Austrian women artists, List of
Artists
Artists